The Boselli government of Italy held office from 18 June 1916 until 30 October 1917, a total of 499 days, or 1 year, 4 months and 12 days.

Government parties
The government was composed by the following parties:

Composition

References

Italian governments
1916 establishments in Italy
1917 disestablishments in Italy